Albert Evans (10 June 1903 – 4 December 1988), was a British Labour Party politician.

A master engraver, Evans became involved in the Labour movement in the 1920s, and was elected to Islington Borough Council in 1936. In March 1946 he was elected to the London County Council to represent Islington West.

He was first elected to Parliament at a by-election in 1947, when the Labour Member of Parliament for Islington West, Frederick Montague, was elevated to the peerage as Baron Amwell.

The Islington West constituency was abolished for the 1950 general election, when Evans was elected in the new Islington South West constituency. He held the seat until he retired from the House of Commons at the 1970 general election.

See also
Dorothy Galton (sister-in-law)

References

1903 births
1988 deaths
Labour Party (UK) MPs for English constituencies
UK MPs 1945–1950
UK MPs 1950–1951
UK MPs 1951–1955
UK MPs 1955–1959
UK MPs 1959–1964
UK MPs 1964–1966
UK MPs 1966–1970
Members of London County Council
Members of Islington Metropolitan Borough Council